Lapoo Zaghmarz International Wetland and abbandan near the Caspian Sea is a swamp where many birds spend the winter every year. Miankaleh Peninsula, Gorgan Bay and Lapoo-Zaghmarz Ab-bandan In 1975, they were registered in the International Wetlands Convention (Ramsar Site).

Although ducks are not seen in the lagoon during the summer, the small chimpanzees and the dark sea turtles have a large number of reproductions, which creates a buzz and interesting scenery. Also, various types of aquatic animals such as carp and duck fish are special examples of lapu swamp fish.

According to the documents and images that were provided to the people of zaqmarz during the construction of the middle bridge of the lake, this international wetland was first used as a small swamp with a small width and then by allocating personal lands to the people of Zaghmarz For agriculture.

The end of the water outlet from the eastern part of lapoo abbandan is Shirkhan lapu Wetland, Palangan Wetland, Miankaleh Wetland and Gulf of gorgan, respectively, and finally to the Caspian Sea.

References 

Wetlands of Iran